Benighted (published in the United States as The Old Dark House) is a 1927 novel by the British writer J.B. Priestley. Priestley's second published novel, the story explores the post-First World War disillusionment that Britain felt during the time period. A number of travelers are forced to take shelter at an old Welsh country house during a storm. Because the book was published in the United States in 1928, it won’t enter the public domain in the United States until 2024 in accordance with United States copyright law.

Adaptations
It served as the basis for James Whale's film The Old Dark House in 1932 and its remake in 1963.

Analysis 
The book has been described as a study of British feeling following the First World War. Priestley himself described the book's characters as "forms of postwar pessimism pretending to be people". As an author, Priestley tended to pit characters against people and environments that took place outside their regular circumstances. Within the book, three travelers are taken in by a family, and they discover hidden dark secrets. The book draws on gothic literature elements. In particular, the book draws inspiration from the 1847 novel Jane Eyre.

References

Bibliography
 Baxendale, John. Priestley’s England: J. B. Priestley and English culture. Manchester University Press, 2013.
 Gale, Maggie B. J.B. Priestley. Routledge, 2008. 
 Goble, Alan. The Complete Index to Literary Sources in Film. Walter de Gruyter, 1999.

External links
 Full text of Benighted at HathiTrust Digital Library
 Full text of Benighted at Internet Archive

1927 British novels
Novels by J. B. Priestley
Novels set in Wales
British novels adapted into films
Heinemann (publisher) books